Johann Sebastian Bach's St Matthew Passion, is structured on multiple levels: the composition is structured in three levels of text sources (Gospel, libretto and chorales) and by the different forms that are used for musical expression (arias, recitatives and choruses).

Bach's large choral composition was written to present the Passion, as told in the Gospel of Matthew, in a vespers service on Good Friday. It is composed in two parts, that were to be performed before and after the sermon of that service. Part I covers the events until the arrest of Jesus and Part II concludes with his burial and the sealing of his grave.

Contemporary poetry in Picander's libretto and chorales comment on the Bible text and open and close most scenes of the narration.

Numbering of the movements
Bach did not number the sections of the St Matthew Passion but twentieth-century scholars have done so. The Bach-Werke-Verzeichnis (BWV, Bach Works Catalog) divides the work into 78 numbers (vocal movements), while the Neue Bach-Ausgabe (NBA, New Bach Edition) divides the piece into 68 movements. Both use lettered subsections in some cases. Movement numbers in this article follow the NBA scheme, except for the table with the movements that cross-references both numbering systems.

Text based structure 
The text is taken from three sources: the biblical texts, contemporary poetry by Picander and chorales.

Scene division based on the Gospel text 
The St Matthew Passion can be divided in scenes or "stations" that follow the dramatic action of the Gospel account in different locations. Whatever the chosen scene division (none of them indicated by the composer in the score), scenes end on an aria, a chorus, or in the midst of a Gospel text section. In the latter case the ending of the scene would usually be on a turba chorus, such as  ending the scene where Jesus dies at the cross.

New scenes begin with Gospel text sung by the Evangelist, except the first scene of each of the two parts of the composition. In other words, except for the chorus and aria that open Part One and Part Two, chorales and arias are a meditation after the narration of the action in the sung Gospel text.

Libretto 
Christian Friedrich Henrici (Picander), who collaborated with Bach, wrote text for recitatives and arias, and for the large scale choral movements that open and close the Passion. Other libretto sections came from publications by Salomo Franck and Barthold Heinrich Brockes.

Scenes can be opened and closed by arias: No. 6 , an aria for alto, concludes the scene at Bethany. Part II opens with an aria, .

Chorales 

The oldest chorale chosen for the Passion dates from 1525.

Three of the texts Bach used for chorale settings are written by Paul Gerhardt. Bach included five stanzas of his "" in the Passion, and he uses the first two stanzas of the poem to conclude the Flagellation scene.

Musical structure 

The work is composed for double choir, double orchestra, and vocal soloists.  The choirs are abbreviated Ch I and Ch II, individual voice parts as S (soprano), A (alto), T (tenor), and B (bass). Both choirs are four-part, SATB. The orchestra consists of woodwinds, strings, and basso continuo (Bc). Woodwinds are recorders, flauto traverso (transverse flute) (Ft), oboe (Ob), oboe d'amore (Oa), and oboe da caccia (Oc). Strings are violin (Vn), solo violin (Vs), viola (Va), lute (Lt), and viola da gamba (Vg). Continuo are violoncello, double bass, bassoon, and organ.

The Bible story is told by the Evangelist (Ev) in secco recitative, and by the characters that have direct speech in the narrative. The speech of Jesus sings in accompagnato recitative, except at the beginning of No. 61a where Jesus utters his last words "Eli, Eli, lama, lama asabthani"  in recitative secco (see facsimile image on the right). The speech of other persons, called soliloquents, is also set as secco recitative. Soliloquents are Judas (B), Peter (B), two witnesses (A T), two high priests (B), two maids (S), Pilate (B), and his wife (S). The speech of groups such as the disciples and the crowd, are expressed in turba choruses.

Reflecting thoughts on contemporary poetry appear as sequence of recitatives (rec) and arias, sometimes just the latter, and in choral movements. Most chorales are four-part settings. Several movements use a combination of forms, such as an aria with chorale, a chorale fantasia, a chorus with a chorale as a cantus firmus. Chorales were performed by both groups combined, with each voice type in unison. Movement 63b,  (Truly, this man was God's own Son most truly), is treated the same way. Part I ends with a chorale fantasia that is based on the opening chorus of the St John Passion in its second version, also performed by both choirs in unison, whereas the opening chorus is for double choir with the chorale "" as the cantus firmus, which was originally played, later sung. The closing chorus is in da capo form for two choirs.

Movements
Column 1 of the table is the movement number in the Neue Bach-Ausgabe; column 2 is this number in the Bach-Werke-Verzeichnis. The last column shows the incipit, the first measures of each movement with text.

References

Sources
 
 
 St. Matthew passion BWV 244; BC D 3b / Passion Leipzig University
 Matthäus-Passion BWV 244 history, scoring, sources for text and music, translations to various languages, discography, discussion, bach-cantatas website
 Matthäuspassion history, scoring, Bach website 
 BWV 244 Matthäus-Passion Sources, English translation, University of Vermont
 BWV 244 Matthäuspassion text, scoring, University of Alberta
 Tim Smith and Ben Kammin: The Chorales of Bach's St. Matthew Passion: their Sources and Dramatic Roles bach.nau.edu

External links
Uri Golomb: Academia.Edu Liturgical drama in Bach's St. Matthew Passion Goldberg Early Music Magazine 39 (April 2006), pp. 48–59
Rex Levang: The St. Matthew Passion Minnesota Public Radio, text and translation, commentary, 2001

Passions and oratorios by Johann Sebastian Bach

de:Matthäus-Passion (J. S. Bach)#Werkübersicht